John Henderson (1 March 1804 – 27 June 1862) was a Scottish architect operational in the mid-19th century. He is chiefly remembered as a church architect, with his early work being in the Gothic revival and tractarian style, before developing his own distinct style.

Life

He was born at the Den Nursery in Brechin to John Henderson and Agnes Thomson. Henderson's father was a gardener for William Maule, 1st Baron Panmure at Brechin Castle.

He was initially apprenticed as a carpenter but after completing this he pursued studies in drawing and building construction. His first design was for the addition of a steeple at the parish church in Arbroath in 1831. After completing this project, he became an assistant to architect Thomas Hamilton; a post he remained in until establishing his own architecture firm in 1833. This was set up at 1 Blenheim Place (next to R & R Dickson's office) before moving to 6 Union Street. In 1836 he relocated into more prestigious accommodation at 16 London Street, then was variously at 8 Duke Street (now called Dublin Street), 73 Queen Street (at his peak) and finally at 7 Hill Street.

He designed and oversaw the building of numerous churches in Scotland up until his death in 1862 at the age of 58. He also notably designed the original buildings for Glenalmond College. Several notable architects were trained by him, including Alexander Davidson, William Hay, John Milne, James Milne Monro, and his son George Henderson. On his death, his son who was only 16, completed his apprenticeship with David Cousin.

Henderson died at home, 7 Greenhill Park (a villa of his own design) in south-west Edinburgh on 27 June 1862. He was buried in Grange Cemetery in south Edinburgh. The grave lies in the north-west section.

Family
He was married to Hannah Matilda Exley (1821–1897). They had at least three children.

Works
see

Renewing steeple, Arbroath Parish Church (1831)
Kilmabreck Parish Church (1831)
Samuel Douglas Free School, Newton Stewart (1834)
Tenement 1-3 George IV Bridge, Edinburgh (1836)
Christ Church Episcopal Church, Mile End, Glasgow (1836)
Morningside Parish Church, Edinburgh (1836)
Bannockburn Chapel of Ease (1837)
Holy Trinity Episcopal Church, Dean Bridge, Edinburgh (1837)
Natural History Museum, Montrose (1837)
St Marys Church, Dumfries (1837)
Carnock Parish Church (1838)
Tower and spire, Fettercairn Parish Church (1838)
Lady Glenorchy's Church, Blenheim Place, Edinburgh (1838)
Mechanic's Institute, Brechin (1838)
Newhaven Parish Church (1838)
Tenements, Granton Square, Edinburgh (1838)
Granton Hotel (1838)
Mariners Church, Commercial Street, Leith (1839) (now flatted)
Panmure Testimonial (a monument to William Maule), Camustane Hill, Panmure (1839)
Lodge and gates to Niddrie Marischal House, Edinburgh (1839)
Monument to Bishop Alexander Jolly, Turiff Episcopal Church (1840)
Maryburgh Church (1840)
St Thomas Church, School, Manse and Female Asylum, Leith (1840) the church is now a Sikh Temple
Fraserburgh Episcopal Church
Burntisland Harbour: pier, workshops, houses and hotel (1841-3)
North Church, Stirling (1841)
Church Hill House, Edinburgh (1842)
Feuing of Church Hill housing, Edinburgh (1842)
Trinity College and hall, now called Glenalmond College (1843)
Varrich House, Church Hill, Edinburgh (1843)
Cuminestown Episcopal Church (1844)
St Devenick's Manse, Banchory (1844)
St Marys Episcopal Church, Montrose (1844)
St Marys Episcopal Church, Dunblane (1844)
Stirling Episcopal Church (1845)
St Marys Episcopal Church, Hamilton, Lanarkshire (1845)
St Columbas Episcopal Church, Johnston Terrace, Edinburgh (1846)
Feuing plan, Hope Park, St Andrews (1847)
St Andrews Episcopal Chapel, Fasque (1847)
Holyrood Free Church, Edinburgh (1848)
Meggernie Castle, Glenlyon (1848)
St Johns Episcopal Church, Cranstonhill, Glasgow (1848)
St Philips Episcopal Church, School, Hall and Rectory, Catterline, Kincardineshire (1848)
Cairnies Farmhouse and Steading, Glenalmond (1848)
All Saints Episcopal Church, Woodhead, Aberdeenshire (1849)
Holy Trinity Episcopal Church and rectory, Kilbride Hill, Dunoon (1850)
Remodelling of New Pitsligo Episcopal Church (1850)
St Marys Episcopal Church, Rectory and School, Ratho (1850)
Christ Church Episcopal Church, Rectory and School, Lochgilphead (1851)
West Linton Combined Episcopal Church and School (1851)
Borthwick Hall, Heriot, Midlothian (1852)
St Lukes Free Church, Edinburgh (1852) demolished
St Margarets Episcopal Church, Meigle, Perthshire (1852)
Lady Elizabeth Ross Memorial, Kincardine Churchyard, Ardgay (1853)
St Andrews Episcopal School and Library, Brechin (1853)
St Peters Episcopal Church, Galashiels (1853)
Villas, Greenhill Park, Edinburgh (1853) including 7 Greenhill Park as his own house
St Michaels and All Saints Chapel, Inverkip (1854)
Alterations to Brechin Castle (1854)
Alterations to Carse Gray House, Forfar (1854)
St Marys Episcopal Church and Rectory, Arbroath (1854)
Bridge over River Den to access Brechin Cemetery (1856)
Holy Trinity Episcopal Church, Lamington, South Lanarkshire (1857)
St Mary Episcopal Church, Rectory and School, Port Glasgow (1857)
St Mungos Episcopal Church and Rectory, East Linton (1857)
Tenements School, Brechin (1857)
Christ Episcopal Church, Lanark (1858)
Feuing of Greenhill estate, Edinburgh (1858)
St Peters Episcopal Church and Rectory, Montrose (1858)
Burgh Episcopal School, Galashiels (1859)
India Buildings, Victoria Street, Edinburgh (1859) (works completed by David Cousin after Henderson's death)
St Margarets College, Crieff (1859)

References

1804 births
1862 deaths
19th-century Scottish architects
Gothic Revival architects